Berkswell is a village and civil parish in the Metropolitan Borough of Solihull, county of West Midlands, England.

The United Kingdom Census 2001 recorded a parish population of 2,843, increasing to 3,139 at the 2011 Census.

History and places of interest
The parish includes a number of hamlets as well as Berkswell village. Berkswell railway station serves the village, but is actually much closer to Balsall Common than to Berkswell village (it was formerly 'Berkswell & Balsall Common' station).

The Church of England parish church of St. John Baptist is a late-12th century Norman building, notable for its two-part crypt. The eastern part is a rectangular space of two bays under the chancel. The western part is an unusual octagonal space under the eastern part of the nave. Later features of the church include the Perpendicular Gothic windows of the north aisle and the two-storied wooden porch.

Berkswell's toponym is derived from the Berks Well, a  square, stone-walled water well just outside the churchyard. It is said to have been used for baptisms by immersion and can still be seen today.

There are several 16th and 17th century houses in the village. The Bear Inn dates from the 16th century. The local history society runs a small museum in a 17th-century cottage near the church.

The Old Rectory, now called The Well House, south of the church, is early 18th century, then replacing a rectory whose records go back to early 17th century. The almshouses were built in 1853.

There is a village green on which are the stocks that were used for punishing petty offenders. It is claimed that these were especially built for a one-legged ex-soldier and his two drinking companions as there are only five leg holes.

On Windmill Lane is the protected and restored Berkswell Windmill, a fine example of a tower mill with its original machinery.

Other local features include Marsh Lane Nature Reserve. There is a small Church of England primary school near the church on Church Lane.

Notable residents
Notable people from Berkswell include the actor Jeremy Brett, whose roles include Sherlock Holmes in a television drama series, tennis player Maud Watson – the first Ladies Singles Champion in 1884 at The Championships, Wimbledon and Bob Wyatt (R.E.S.), England Cricket Captain for a number of years from 1934. The Beastie Boys stayed in the village for two weeks in 1988, writing the B-side Jubbsy's Treasure. Former county cricketer Dominic Ostler, a key member of Warwickshire's historic treble winning side in 1994, who lives in neighbouring Balsall Common, went on to skipper Berkswell Cricket Club in the Birmingham League, winning the league's Twenty20 Cup competition in 2010.

Filming
Numerous television series have shot scenes in Berkswell – including BBC's Beat the Boss and ITV's Comedy/Drama Love and Marriage.

See also
Berkswell Hall

Nailcote Hall

References

Sources and further reading

Gallery

External links

panoramic 360 view of Berkswell (Virtual Midlands)
St John Baptist parish church website – includes information of the village
local history group website

Geograph photos of Berkswell and surrounding area

Villages in the West Midlands (county)
Conservation areas in England